Nichijou is a 2011 Japanese anime television series produced by Kyoto Animation based on the comedy manga by Keiichi Arawi. The series is directed by Tatsuya Ishihara and aired in Japan from April 3, 2011 to September 26, 2011. It was also simulcasted by Crunchyroll (which was independently owned at the time) under the name My Ordinary Life. Prior to the airing of the anime series, an original video animation (OVA), titled Nichijou Episode 0, shipped with the sixth manga volume on March 12, 2011. Initially licensed by Bandai Entertainment in North America, Funimation later licensed the series and released it on February 7, 2017 with subtitles and again with an English dub on July 23, 2019. In March 2022, the Funimation produced English dub of Nichijou became available on Crunchyroll, who acquired from its later owner AT&T in 2021 by parent company Sony Pictures Television, who in turn acquired Funimation in 2018 and was itself renamed that same month.



Episode list

References

External links

www.kyotoanimation.co.jp/works/nichijou/

Nichijou